Darling House may refer to:

Australia
 Darling House, Millers Point, a heritage-listed house in Sydney, New South Wales

United States
 Robert and Julia Darling House, Simsbury, Connecticut, listed on the National Register of Historic Places (NRHP)
 Jay Norwood and Genevieve Pendleton Darling House, Des Moines, Iowa, NRHP-listed
 Henry Darling House, Woonsocket, Rhode Island, NRHP-listed
 Frederick L. Darling House, Hudson, Wisconsin, NRHP-listed